Simpleton (born Christopher Harrison, Saint Andrew Parish, Jamaica, 1971) was a Jamaican reggae DJ whose claim to fame was the 1992 hit single,"Coca Cola Bottle Shape."

Biography
Earlier records of this artist bring his name as Dracula and not Simpleton on the label "How you fi say dat". Simpleton released three reggae albums in the mid-1990s.  After being virtually idle from the Jamaican music scene, Simpleton died from a heart attack on 7 November 2004 in Kingston, Jamaica.

Discography
Coca Cola Bottle Shape (1992) 
1/4 to 12 (1996)
Drive Man Crazy (1998)

External links
Obituary, The Jamaican Observer

1971 births
2004 deaths
People from Saint Andrew Parish, Jamaica
Jamaican dancehall musicians
Jamaican reggae musicians
VP Records artists